Edward Frederick Langley Russell, 2nd Baron Russell of Liverpool CBE, MC (10 April 1895 – 8 April 1981), known as Langley Russell, was a British soldier, lawyer, historian and writer.

Early life, family and education
Russell was the son of Richard Henry Langley Russell, second son of Edward Russell, 1st Baron Russell of Liverpool, and succeeded his grandfather to the title in 1920. He was educated at Liverpool College and St John's College, Cambridge (1913–1914).

Military service

World War I
He left Cambridge to join the British Army soon after the outbreak of war. He served with distinction in the First World War, winning the Military Cross three times.

Legal career
He was called to the bar at Gray's Inn in 1931, but never developed a substantial practice on the Oxford circuit. He developed a career in the Judge Advocate's office from the early 1930s.

World War II
He became Deputy Judge Advocate General (United Kingdom) to the British Army of the Rhine in 1945. He was one of the chief legal advisers during war-crimes proceedings, for both the Nuremberg trials and the Tokyo tribunal, held following the end of the Second World War.
He was honoured with the CBE, Commander of the Order of the British Empire.

Writings
He resigned from his government post over the publication of his book The Scourge of the Swastika: A Short History of Nazi War Crimes. The Daily Express, under proprietor Lord Beaverbrook, published extracts under the heading "the book they tried to ban" in 1954, and the book became a bestseller. Russell was accused of misusing his position to profit personally from the war crimes he had investigated.

Russell followed up this work in 1958 with The Knights of Bushido: A Short History of Japanese War Crimes.

In 1959 he and Bertrand Russell, the celebrated mathematician and philosopher, sent a joint letter to The Times explaining that they were different people.

A6 murder case
Lord Russell became involved in investigating the sensational A6 murder in rural Bedfordshire in August 1961 and the long-running debate that followed it.
He wrote the book Deadman's Hill: Was Hanratty Guilty? in 1965, which asserted wrongful conviction in the case. Lord Russell and his wife suffered significant harassment, in the form of frequent anonymous telephone calls, from Peter Louis Alphon, who had been an early suspect in the murder, before James Hanratty was found guilty and hanged in April 1962. Alphon was convicted and fined for this harassment, and his long-running involvement in the matter has remained controversial. This case has continued to attract significant interest, with several further books, articles and television programmes investigating it, with many asserting Hanratty's wrongful conviction, and some key aspects are still unclear.

Death
Lord Russell of Liverpool died in April 1981, a few days short of his 86th birthday, and was succeeded to the barony by his grandson Simon Russell, as his only son Captain the Hon. Langley Gordon Haslingden Russell had predeceased him.

Works
 The Scourge of the Swastika: A Short History of Nazi War Crimes (1954) (Also translated into Yiddish in 1956)
 Though the Heavens Fall (1956)
 The Knights of Bushido: A Short History of Japanese War Crimes (1958)
 That Reminds Me (1959)
 If I Forget Thee: The Story of a Nation's Rebirth (1960)
 The Record; The Trial of Adolf Eichmann for His Crimes Against the Jewish People and Against Humanity (1961)
 The Royal Conscience (1961)
 Knight of the sword: The Life and Letters of Admiral Sir William Sidney Smith (1962)
 The Tragedy of The Congo (1962)
 Prisons and Prisoners in Portugal: An Independent Investigation (1963)
 Deadman's Hill: Was Hanratty Guilty? (1965)
 Henry of Navarre; Henry IV of France (1969)
 The French Corsairs (1970)
 Bernadotte: Marshal of France & King of Sweden (1981)

Books in which Edward Russell, 2nd Baron Russell of Liverpool contributed a foreword or an introduction:
 Harvest of Hate: The Nazi Program for the Destruction of the Jews of Europe by Leon Poliakov (1954)
 The Urge to Punish: New Approaches to the Problem of Mental Irresponsibility for Crime by Henry Weihofen (1957)
 Forgive, But Do Not Forget by Sylvia Salvesen (1958)
 Commandant of Auschwitz: The Autobiography of Rudolf Hoess by Rudolf Hoess (1961)

Arms

References

Sources
Kidd, Charles, Williamson, David (editors). Debrett's Peerage and Baronetage (1990 edition). New York: St Martin's Press, 1990.

1895 births
1981 deaths
People educated at Liverpool College
Alumni of St John's College, Cambridge
Barons in the Peerage of the United Kingdom
British Army personnel of World War I
British Army personnel of World War II
20th-century English judges
Members of Gray's Inn
British legal writers
Commanders of the Order of the British Empire
Recipients of the Military Cross
King's Regiment (Liverpool) officers
20th-century English historians
Lawyers from Liverpool